Khedivial Mail S.S. Company was a steam ship company that ran ships from Alexandria, Egypt. The exact date of its creation is unknown although it was most likely created during the latter half of the 1800s.

The company was a successor to the Medjidieh, a steamship company that operated in the Red Sea and the Mediterranean, created by Said Pasha. The Medjidieh was also referred to as the Egyptian Steam Navigation Company, and quickly failed under the leadership of Said Pasha. His successor, Isma'il Pasha, restarted the venture in May 1863 in the hopes of creating a merchant marine for the modernizing Egyptian nation. After falling into debt, Ismail used the company as leverage to try to gain control of and merge with the Egyptian Commercial and Trading Company, a European trading firm based in Egypt, in order to become a player in European financial markets. The venture was unsuccessful, and the merger never appeared.

The company was renamed in 1898 as the Khedivial Mail S.S. Company and it sailed under the British Flag, as part of the Peninsular and Oriental Steam Navigation Company. It continued to operate and expand well into the first half of the 1900s, later adopting shipping routes that would bring its ships to the United States. Although traditionally the company sailed its ships to ports in Egypt, the Ottoman Empire, Syria and other ports on the eastern side of the Mediterranean.

The company once again changed its name to the Pharonic Mail Line in 1936, and was finally nationalized by the Egyptian government in 1961 into the United Arab Maritime Company.

References

External links
Cruiselinehistory.com
www.theshipslist.com

Shipping companies of Egypt
Defunct shipping companies of the United Kingdom